Vernon Larnard Norwood (born April 10, 1992) is an American track and field athlete who specializes in the 400 meters.

Biography
Raised in New Orleans, Louisiana, he is the son of Curtis Norwood and Charliette Ray. At Morgan City High School Norwood started running track in his junior year.

College
For South Plains College Norwood was a multiple time NJCAA national champion.

For the LSU Tigers he was a four time NCAA national champion.

Professional
At the 2015 USA Outdoor Track and Field Championships Norwood finished 3rd to secure a spot for the United States at the 2015 World Championships in Athletics for the 400 meters and 4x400 relay.

During the 2016 indoor season, Norwood made his second USA team. At the 2016 IAAF World Indoor Championships, he was DQ for stepping on the inside of his lane during the first round of the 400 meters, and won Gold in the 4 x 400 meters.

USA National Track and field Championships

International competitions

References

External links

Vernon Norwood athletic profile

1992 births
Living people
African-American male track and field athletes
American male sprinters
Athletes (track and field) at the 2020 Summer Olympics
People from Morgan City, Louisiana
Track and field athletes from Louisiana
LSU Tigers track and field athletes
Medalists at the 2020 Summer Olympics
Olympic bronze medalists for the United States in track and field
Olympic gold medalists for the United States in track and field
USA Indoor Track and Field Championships winners
World Athletics Championships athletes for the United States
World Athletics Championships medalists
World Athletics Championships winners
World Athletics Indoor Championships medalists
World Athletics Indoor Championships winners
21st-century African-American sportspeople